Arakhin (Arachin, עֲרָכִין) ([vows of the] values [of people]) is the fifth tractate in the Order of Kodashim (holies).

Chapters
Chapters 1–6 (based on ) deal with the vows of donating one's prescribed value as part of the dedication to the Temple, as well as other gifts to bedek habayis, or the treasury of the Temple. Chapters 7-8 explain the redemption from the Temple of a field one has inherited (based on ). Chapter 8 addresses herem (based on ), while the last chapter deals with the laws of ancestral fields and houses in walled cities, and how they are redeemed (based on ).

References